Stojan "Stole" Aranđelović (12 June 1930 – 8 April 1993) was a Serbian film actor. He appeared in 120 films between 1955 and 1993.

He was born and died in Belgrade, Yugoslavia.

Selected filmography

 Crveni cvet (1950) - Oficir
 Pesma sa Kumbare (1955) - Marko
 Solaja (1955) - Kolesko
 Djevojka i hrast (1955) - Petar ... Ivanov brat
 Potraga (1956) - Zarko ... radnik u stampariji
 Michel Strogoff (1956) - Tatar soldat (uncredited)
 Zenica (1957) - Hasan
 Mali covek (1957)
 Rafal u nebo (1958)
 Oleko Dundich (1958) - Rasovic
 The Sky Through the Trees (1958) - Tifusar
 Tempest (1958) - Peasant (uncredited)
 Train Without a Timetable (1959) - Lovre
 Point 905 (1960) - Gavran
 Partizanske price (1960) - (segment "Povratak")
 Bolje je umeti (1960)
 Nebeski odred (1961)
 Ne diraj u srecu (1961)
 La steppa (1962) - Kiriuka
 Kapi, vode, ratnici (1962) - (segment "Mali skver")
 Double Circle (1963) - Dugi
 Zemljaci (1963)
 U sukobu (1963)
 Grad (1963) - Covek (segment "Obruc")
 Freddy in the Wild West (1964) - Perkins Henchman #1
 Last of the Renegades (1964) - Caesar
 Amongst Vultures (1964) - Milton
 Sette a Tebe (1964)
 Man Is Not a Bird (1965) - Barbulovic 'Barbool'
 Three (1965) - Zeka ... verski fanatik
 Klakson (1965) - Lugar
 The Oil Prince (1965) - Bandit (uncredited)
 Neprijatelj (1965)
 Konjuh planinom (1966) - Rudar
 Roj (1966)
 The Dream (1966)
 Povratak (1966) - Stole
 Tople godine (1966)
 Glineni golub (1966) - Bosko
 Palma medju palmama (1967) - Suri
 Playing Soldiers (1967) - Jagos
 Brat doktora Homera (1968) - Kurtes
 Lelejska gora (1968) - Kosto Amerika
 Operacija Beograd (1968) - Invalid Luka
 It Rains in My Village (1968) - Kondukter u vozu
 Sunce tudjeg neba (1968) - Nikola
 Battle of Neretva (1969) - Sumadinac
 Uloga moje porodice u svjetskoj revoluciji (1971)
 Ovcar (1971) - Skeledzija
 Makedonski del od pekolot (1971) - Bugarski vojnik
 Bronte: cronaca di un massacro che i libri di storia non hanno raccontato (1972) - Calogero Gasparazzo
 Slike iz zivota udarnika (1972)
 Battle of Sutjeska (1973) - Pop
 So (1973)
 Scalawag (1973) - Beanbelly
 Doktor Mladen (1975) - Svestenik
 Pavle Pavlovic (1975) - Pavlov brat
 Anno Domini 1573 (1975) - Petrov stric
 Naivko (1975) - Vesko
 Salas u Malom Ritu (1976) - Skeledzija
 Cetiri dana do smrti (1976)
 Vojnikova ljubav (1976)
 Povratak otpisanih (1976) - Isa
 Ispravi se, Delfina (1977) - Stariot trener na francuskata obala
 Trofej (1979) - Lukac
 Pozorisna veza (1980) - Velja
 Crveniot konj (1981) - Nikola
 Sesta brzina (1981) - Carinik Blagota
 The Falcon (1981) - Pop Gradislav
 Zalazak sunca (1982) - Opat
 Twilight Time (1982) - Matan
 Zadah tela (1983) - Milkin otac
 Kamiondzije opet voze (1984) - Truman
 Vojnici (1984) - Zastavnik Desimir Markovic
 Kraj rata (1984) - Vlasnik kafane
 Sest dana juna (1985) - Milicionar 1
 Na putu za Katangu (1987) - Grgur
 The Dark Side of the Sun (1988 - released in 1997) - Vidar (the healer)
 Jednog lepog dana (1988) - Velja
 Seobe (1989)
 Coprnica Zofka (1989) - (Serbian version, voice)
 Poltron (1989) - Zoricin otac
 Zena s krajolikom (1989) - Sumar
 Vreme cuda (1989) - Slepac
 Uros blesavi (1989)
 Granica (1990) - Nikola Topic
 Noc u kuci moje majke (1991) - Ozren
 Tetoviranje (1991) - Majstor
 Tri karte za Hollywood (1993) - Nosac
 Obracun u kazino kabareu (1993) - Covek sa puskom (final film role)

See also
 Cinema of Yugoslavia

External links

1930 births
1993 deaths
Male actors from Belgrade
Serbian male film actors
20th-century Serbian male actors